In mathematics, the Volterra integral equations are a special type of integral equations. They are divided into two groups referred to as the first and the second kind.

A linear Volterra equation of the first kind is

where f is a given function and x is an unknown function to be solved for.  A linear Volterra equation of the second kind is

In operator theory, and in Fredholm theory, the corresponding operators are called Volterra operators.  A useful method to solve such equations, the Adomian decomposition method, is due to George Adomian.

A linear Volterra integral equation is a convolution equation if

The function  in the integral is called the kernel. Such equations can be analyzed and solved by means of Laplace transform techniques.

The Volterra integral equations were introduced by Vito Volterra and then studied by Traian Lalescu in his 1908 thesis, Sur les équations de Volterra, written under the direction of Émile Picard.   In 1911, Lalescu wrote the first book ever on integral equations.

Volterra integral equations find application in demography as Lotka's integral equation, the study of viscoelastic materials,
in actuarial science through the renewal equation, and in fluid mechanics to describe the flow behavior near finite-sized boundaries.

Conversion of Volterra equation of the first kind to the second kind 
A linear Volterra equation of the first kind can always be reduced to a linear Volterra equation of the second kind, assuming that .  Taking the derivative of the first kind Volterra equation gives us:Dividing through by  yields:Defining  and  completes the transformation of the first kind equation into a linear Volterra equation of the second kind.

Numerical solution using trapezoidal rule 

Application: Ruin theory 
One area where Volterra integral equations appear is in ruin theory, the study of the risk of insolvency in actuarial science. In the classical model of ruin theory, the net cash position  is a function of the initial surplus, premium income earned at rate , and outgoing claims :where  is a Poisson process for the number of claims with intensity . Under these circumstances, the ruin probability may be represented by a Volterra integral equation of the form:where  is the survival function of the claims distribution.

See also 
 Fredholm integral equation
 Integral equation
 Integro-differential equation

References

Further reading 
Traian Lalescu, Introduction à la théorie des équations intégrales. Avec une préface de É. Picard, Paris: A. Hermann et Fils, 1912. VII + 152 pp.

Integral Equations: Exact Solutions at EqWorld: The World of Mathematical Equations

External links 
 IntEQ: a Python package for numerically solving Volterra integral equations

Integral equations